was a village located in Sarashina District, Nagano Prefecture, Japan.

As of 2003, the village had an estimated population of 1,467 and a density of 31.99 persons per km2. The total area was 45.86 km2.

On January 1, 2005, Ōoka, along with the town of Toyono, and the villages of Togakushi and Kinasa (all from Kamiminochi District), was merged into the expanded city of Nagano.

Dissolved municipalities of Nagano Prefecture
Nagano (city)